The Shanghai Institutes for Biological Sciences are a research institute of the Chinese Academy of Sciences, in Shanghai, established on July 3, 1999.
When it was created, it was one of four basic science research institutions of China. Its director is biochemist Li Lin, who has served since 2013.

Footnotes

References

External links

1999 establishments in China
Research institutes of the Chinese Academy of Sciences
Education in Shanghai